Pedro Miguel Dinis Ferreira (born 5 January 1998) is a Portuguese professional footballer who plays as a defensive midfielder for Danish Superliga club AaB.

Club career

Sporting CP
Born in Marinha Grande, Leiria District, Ferreira developed at Vieirense and União de Leiria before joining the ranks of Sporting CP in 2011. In July 2018, having not made a senior appearance for Sporting or their reserves, he joined LigaPro club Mafra on a season-long loan. He made his debut on 12 August in a 1–0 win at Varzim as a 76th-minute substitute for Bruninho. He played 29 times for the team from Lisbon District, split almost evenly between starts and appearances from the bench.

Varzim
In July 2019, Ferreira cancelled his Sporting contract to enable him to sign for Varzim on a free transfer. His previous employers retained 50% of his economic rights, however.

AaB
Ferreira joined Danish Superliga club AaB on 19 August 2020, signing a four-year deal. He made his debut on 13 September, on the first matchday of the 2020–21 season, in a 0–0 draw against Lyngby Boldklub.

He scored his first two professional goals on 12 September 2021 in a league game against Viborg FF, helping his team to a 3–2 away win.

References

External links
 
 

1998 births
People from Marinha Grande
Living people
Portuguese footballers
Portuguese expatriate footballers
Portugal youth international footballers
Association football midfielders
C.D. Mafra players
Varzim S.C. players
AaB Fodbold players
Liga Portugal 2 players
Danish Superliga players
Portuguese expatriate sportspeople in Denmark
Expatriate men's footballers in Denmark
Sportspeople from Leiria District